Beorhthelm (also Brihthelm, Brithelm, Brithelmus, Birthelm, Birhelm, Byrhthelm, Bertelin, Bettelin, or Bertram) is an Anglo-Saxon male given name.

Bishops 
 Beorhthelm of Winchester, Bishop of Winchester 
 Brihthelm (bishop of London) (died between 957 and 959)
 Brihthelm (Bishop of Selsey) (died between 956 and 963)
 Byrhthelm (bishop of Wells) (died 973), and briefly Archbishop of Canterbury

Saints 
 Beorhthelm of Stafford, patron saint of Stafford
 Beorhthelm of Shaftesbury, a 10th-century Anglo-Saxon saint

See also
 "The Homecoming of Beorhtnoth Beorhthelm's Son", a 1953 play by J. R. R. Tolkien